Nivedita and variants may refer to:

People 
Sister Nivedita (1867–1911), disciple of Swami Vivekananda
Charu Nivedita, Tamil writer
Niveditha Arjun (active from 1986), Indian actress, producer and dancer in Kannada cinema
Nivedita Joshi, Marathi and Hindi actress
Nivedita Bhattacharya (born 1970), Indian actress
Nivedita Bhasin (born 1963), Indian pilot
Nivedita Sambhajirao Mane (born 1963), Indian MP
Nivedita Jain (1979–1998), Indian former actress and model
Nivedhitha, Kannada film actress, formerly known as Smitha
Baby Niveditha, Malayalam child actress
Niveda Thomas (born 1995), also known as Niveditha, Malayalam film actress
Libi Rana, also known as Nivedita, Indian film actress from the 1960s and 1970s

Other uses 
Nivedita Setu, bridge over the Hooghly River in West Bengal
Sister Nivedita University, in West Bengal

See also
Nivetha